The Super Bowl curse or Super Bowl hangover is a phrase that refers to three phenomena that may occur in the National Football League (NFL). These interpretations of the Super Bowl curse are not mutually exclusive. 

First, there is the "home field advantage curse" referring to team(s) whose stadium will host the upcoming Super Bowl having a tendency to miss the playoffs or suffer early postseason elimination. In fact, no Super Bowl host team had managed to reach the title game until the 2020 season, when the Tampa Bay Buccaneers played in Super Bowl LV as the first such team to play—and subsequently win—at its home stadium, and the Los Angeles Rams, who won against the Cincinnati Bengals in Super Bowl LVI.

Second, Super Bowl champions rarely win consecutive Super Bowls, compared to other professional sports leagues such as Major League Baseball, the National Basketball Association, or the National Hockey League.

Lastly, the loser of the prior year's Super Bowl will often have a less successful season and may miss the playoffs the next year.

The term has been used since at least 1992, when The Washington Post used the term in print. Former NFL General Manager Charley Casserly attributed the curse to such factors as "a shorter offseason, contract problems, [and] more demand for your players' time". Casserly also noted that "once the season starts, you become the biggest game on everybody's schedule," suggesting that pressure from fans and spectators may also affect a team's performance.

The Home Field Advantage Curse
The home field curse is said to affect the host team(s) of the Super Bowl. So far only one team, the 2020 Tampa Bay Buccaneers, has managed to qualify to play in the Super Bowl in their home stadium, Raymond James Stadium as the home team, winning Super Bowl LV. The 2021 Los Angeles Rams also qualified for (and won) Super Bowl LVI at their home stadium, SoFi Stadium, but were designated as the away team due to the AFC being the home team in the rotation (meaning the Los Angeles Chargers were technically the host team).

Besides the 2020 Buccaneers and 2021 Rams, two other NFL teams have reached the Super Bowl hosted in their home region: the 1984 San Francisco 49ers, who played (and won) Super Bowl XIX in Stanford Stadium, rather than Candlestick Park, and the 1979 Los Angeles Rams, who played Super Bowl XIV in the Rose Bowl, rather than the Los Angeles Memorial Coliseum. Besides Stanford Stadium and the Rose Bowl, the only other Super Bowl venue that was not the home stadium to an NFL team at the time was Rice Stadium in Houston: the Houston Oilers had played there previously, but moved to the Astrodome several years prior to Super Bowl VIII. The Miami Orange Bowl was the only AFL stadium to host a Super Bowl and the only stadium to host consecutive Super Bowls, hosting Super Bowl II and III. Currently, there are two stadiums that are home to two NFL teams of both conferences: MetLife Stadium in New Jersey, which hosted Super Bowl XLVIII, is the home stadium of two NFL teams: the New York Giants and the New York Jets, and SoFi Stadium, which hosted Super Bowl LVI, is the home stadium of the Los Angeles Chargers and the Los Angeles Rams.

Six teams with Super Bowls in their home venue have qualified for the divisional playoffs: the Dolphins twice in 1994 and 1998, the 2016 Houston Texans, the 2017 Minnesota Vikings, the 2020 Tampa Bay Buccaneers, and the 2021 Los Angeles Rams, and three have qualified to play in the conference championship game: the Vikings in the 2017 NFC Championship Game, the Buccaneers in the 2020 NFC Championship Game, and the Rams in the 2021 NFC Championship Game (the 2021 Rams became the first Super Bowl host team to host a Conference Championship). From 1966–2011 (excluding the six Super Bowl games held in a stadium without a professional team), the Super Bowl host team has had 11 winning seasons, four split seasons, and 25 losing seasons. Mathematically, the probability of that many losing seasons or more occurring by chance (assuming a 50 percent chance of having a losing season (disregarding .500 seasons)) is 7.69 percent. Beginning with the 2021 season, the NFL stretched to 17 games being played; it is no longer possible to have a split season unless there is a tie game. The Super Bowl host stadium is selected several years before the game is played, without regard to the teams that qualify.

This list of examples is not exhaustive; until 2020, no team had ever qualified and played in the Super Bowl while their home stadium was hosting it. Furthermore, a Super Bowl host stadium's team has never been the #1 seed nor had the best overall record in the league, as the 2020 Buccaneers were the fifth seed in the NFC.

The Non-Repeat Curse
Since 1993, few winning teams have followed up their Super Bowl appearances with a second Super Bowl appearance, or even advanced to a conference title game in the subsequent season (the 1994 Dallas Cowboys qualified for their conference title but did not qualify for the Super Bowl). Only seven teams have won back-to-back Super Bowl championships, and only one of these seven have made more than two consecutive winning appearances in the Super Bowl. The only franchise to reach more than three straight title games was the Buffalo Bills who lost four Super Bowls in a row from 1990 to 1993. The salary cap, draft, free agency and the schedule makes it more difficult to win repeat league championships in the NFL, compared to other major North American professional sports leagues (Major League Baseball, the National Basketball Association, and the National Hockey League) where dynasties have been prevalent.

Since 2005, no incumbent holder has managed to successfully defend their title. Between 2006 and 2013, every defending Super Bowl champion would conclude the following season either losing their opening playoff game or failing to qualify for the playoffs.

This list of examples includes every team that has ever had back-to-back appearances at the Super Bowl.

The "Super Bowl Runner-Up Jinx"
Although many teams experience this phenomenon, it is certainly not the rule. There are many speculations made about potential causal factors for this trend, including the team having a shorter offseason due to their extended postseason play, difficulty settling contracts, more pressure on the players, and an increase in visibility, which could contribute to nervous playing. Only the 1971 Dallas Cowboys, 1972 Miami Dolphins, and 2018 New England Patriots have followed up a Super Bowl defeat with a Super Bowl win the following season.

One feature of the Super Bowl Runner-Up Jinx is that the team that loses the Super Bowl will not advance as far as the conference championship game the following season — something only three of the last 27 such teams have done (the Patriots twice). Not only that, but 12 of these 27 Super Bowl runners-up did not even make the playoffs the year after, including four that finished last in their division.

This list of examples is not exhaustive.

Further reading

References

External links

American football-related curses
Curse
Urban legends